This is a list of yaoi (also known as boys' love or BL) anime, manga, OVAs, ONAs, and films.

Manga
The following yaoi titles were originally published as manga; any subsequent adaptations into other mediums are noted.

Other media
The following yaoi titles were originally published in a medium that was not manga or anime, but were later adapted into a manga or anime.

Notes

References

Lists of anime by genre
Lists of manga by genre
 
Hentai
Shōnen-ai
 
Gay masculinity
Gay male mass media
Gay male erotica
 
LGBT-related mass media in Japan
LGBT in anime and manga